Events from the year 1748 in France.

Incumbents 
Monarch: Louis XV

Events
 
 
 
 April – Maastricht is conquered by Maurice de Saxe.
 April 24 – War of the Austrian Succession: A congress assembles at Aix-la-Chapelle (Aachen) with the intent to conclude the war.
 October 18 – War of the Austrian Succession: The Treaty of Aix-la-Chapelle is signed to end the war. Great Britain obtains Madras, in India, from France, in exchange for the fortress of Louisbourg in Canada.
 Louis XV of France authorizes a 5% income tax on every individual regardless of social status; the Parlement of Paris protests.

Births
 April 12 – Antoine Laurent de Jussieu, botanist (d. 1836)
 April 27 – Pierre-Louis Ginguené, author (d. 1815) 
 May 3 – Emmanuel Joseph Sieyès, cleric and constitutional theorist (d. 1836)
 May 7 – Olympe de Gouges, playwright and political activist (guillotined 1793)
 May 10 – Louis Jean Pierre Vieillot, ornithologist (d. 1831)
 June 30 – Jacques Dominique, comte de Cassini, astronomer (d. 1845)
 August 30 – Jacques-Louis David, historical painter (d. 1825)
 December 9 – Claude Louis Berthollet, chemist (d. 1822)

Deaths

See also

References

1740s in France